Raymond Hamers (7 September 1932 – 22 August 2021) was a professor at the Vrije Universiteit Brussel in Brussels, Belgium. He discovered a special type of antibodies called single-domain antibodies or nanobodies.

See also
 Flanders Institute for Biotechnology (VIB)
 Ablynx

References

 Hamers-Casterman C, Atarhouch T, Muyldermans S, Robinson G, Hamers C, Songa EB, Bendahman N, Hamers R., Naturally occurring antibodies devoid of light chains, Nature. 1993 June 3;363(6428):446-8.
 Matthyssens G et al., Two variant surface glycoproteins of Trypanosoma brucei have a conserved C-terminus, Nature, 293, 230–233, 1981
 Strosberg AD et al., A rabbit with the allotypic phenotype: ala2a3 b4b5b6, J Immunol, 113, 1313–1318, 1974

1932 births
2021 deaths
Flemish scientists
Free University of Brussels (1834–1969) alumni
Academic staff of the Free University of Brussels (1834–1969)